Anthaku Minchi is a 2018 Indian Telugu-language romantic horror thriller  film written and directed by Jhony, Cinematography by Balreddy and produced by Jai and Padmanabha Reddy under Satish Jai Films and U&I Entertainments banner. It features Rashmi Gautham, Jai sampath, Ajay Ghosh, Surya, Madhunandan, Ravi Prakash in the lead roles. The film was released worldwide on August 24, 2018.It was dubbed into hindi by the same name.

Cast 
 Jai as Raju
 Rashmi Gautam as Madhu Priya
 Ravi Prakash
 Madhunandan
 Ajay Ghosh as Occultist
 Surya

Soundtrack
This film has two songs composed by Sunil Kashyap and lyrics are written by Karunakar Adigarla. Music released on August 21, 2018 through Aditya Music.  and audio launch covered by Friday Poster Channel in Hyderabad.

References

External links
 

2018 films
2010s Telugu-language films
Indian action thriller films
Indian romantic action films
Indian horror drama films
Indian supernatural horror films